Amelia Josephine Burr (November 19, 1878 – June 15, 1968) was an American poet. Born in New York City, she was educated at and graduated from Hunter College (New York). She worked for the Red Cross in 1917–18. She married Reverend Carl H. Elmore of Englewood, New Jersey.

She was described as a "popular lyricist, whose work yet flashes with genuine poetic feeling" and was reputed to have traveled widely. A contemporary source commented, "Her adventures in the Orient have colored her work, and with energy and charm she succeeded in getting to know much concerning the natives and their customs wherever she went. Much of her verse must, of course, be classed as balladry, and it is as a balladist that she has gained a wide audience, but, especially in her later work, there is much more than graceful appeal."

Selected works

Poetical works
 A Roadside Fire, 1913 
 Afterglow, a poem 1913
 In Deep Places, 1914 
 Life and Living 1916 
 The Silver Trumpet 1918
 Hearts Awake: The Pixy, A play, 1919
The above two volumes relate chiefly to World War I
 A child garden in India, for very little people: Verses 1922
 Little houses: A book of poems 1923 
 Selected lyrics 1927

Novels
 A Dealer in Empire; A Romance 1915
 The Three Fires: A Story of Ceylon 1922

Sources
 The Bookman Anthology of Verse (1922)

External links
 
 
 Works by Amelia Josephine Burr at Poetry Archive
 Poem: Rain In The Night

1878 births
1968 deaths
20th-century American poets
American women poets
Hunter College alumni
20th-century American women writers